The Solar art prize is an annual art exhibition hosted by the Royal Society of the Arts, South Australia. The prize was established by Pip Fletcher in 2010, and has consistently invited artists to respond to the subject of climate change. The event's recurring theme is "Caring for Our Planet". Artists are invited to submit new works for consideration, and various prizes are offered. Prizes include cash and sponsor offerings, including tens of thousands of dollars in credits to be redeemed on solar power system services and installations, which include solar panels, hot water systems and batteries. 

In 2014, 51 artists submitted 66 different works. 

The prize endeavors to "maintain Global Warming and its ramifications in the public eye when some are tempted to be fatalistic and give up trying to do anything" and "gives the artists the chance to win solar vouchers for themselves or their friends in South Australia, thereby lowering their carbon footprint and at the same time saving them money." 

Past overall winners of the prize are listed on the event's Facebook page.

References 

Australian art awards